Little Manhattan is a 2005 American romantic comedy-drama film directed by Mark Levin and written by Jennifer Flackett, starring Josh Hutcherson and Charlotte Ray Rosenberg. It is set in Manhattan, and follows a ten-year-old boy as he experiences his first love.

Plot
Gabe, an adventurous 10-year-old boy, lives in Manhattan with his parents who are on the verge of divorcing. Gabe spends most of his free time exploring the city on his scooter. His daily exploits are followed and encouraged by the friendly concierge at his building. Gabe encounters Rosemary, an 11-year-old classmate whom he's known since kindergarten, in a self-defense class. After being partnered with her for sparring, he suddenly notices her as a girl, not another face. To Gabe's elation, they begin spending time together and he is completely enamored with not only her, but her life. Rosemary lives with her loving upper-class parents on the edge of Central Park. One day, Gabe takes Rosemary on a tour through Central Park, and another day they venture across the city for fun and try to inspect an apartment for rent, worrying Gabe's nervous parents. Rosemary's parents take them to hear a jazz pianist at The Carlyle, where the young twosome finally hold hands. After the show, Rosemary's parents tell them to say goodnight and her parents go to get milk. After they walk off, Gabe and Rosemary begin talking, and he interrupts her by kissing her.

Rosemary's family's life is in contrast to Gabe's; his parents have declared an awkward truce while waiting for their divorce to be finalized. As their relationship progresses, Gabe begins to question what is happening to him and why he is falling in love with Rosemary. To complicate matters, he discovers Rosemary is going to summer camp for six weeks and her parents are enrolling her in a private school when she returns. When things seem to be going perfectly, Gabe's world is turned upside down when he and Rosemary are assigned new sparring partners. Gabe is jealous of Rosemary's new partner, a tall blonde boy who's much better at self-defense than Gabe is. With their remaining time running out, Gabe tries to get closer to Rosemary, but only drives her away. In a desperate move to win Rosemary back, Gabe attempts to show off and earn his yellow belt, but painfully fractures his hand in the process.

Being crushed with what love really is, he learns from his father that his parents' marriage fell apart because of things left unsaid. Realizing he is running out of time, Gabe goes to find Rosemary at a wedding reception she is attending and declares his love. Taken aback, Rosemary replies she does not think she is ready for love, but is really happy to see Gabe and asks him to dance. As they dance, Gabe muses that he and Rosemary were on different paths—"like two ships that passed in Sheep Meadow". He returns home to find his parents laughing over their honeymoon recollections. Gabe is pleased and surprised when his father says he "cleared out some old stuff" and his parents appear to have reconciled. They happily go out for dinner, and as the movie ends, Gabe, narrating, summarizes what Rosemary meant to him: "...I'm never gonna get another first love. That one's always gonna be her."

Cast
 Josh Hutcherson as Gabriel "Gabe" Burton, The main protagonist who falls in love with Rosemary Telesco
 Charlotte Ray Rosenberg  (credited as Charlie Ray) as Rosemary Telesco, Gabe's love interest
 Bradley Whitford and Cynthia Nixon as Adam Burton and Leslie Burton, Gabe's parents
 Willie Garson as Ralph, the elevator man who's nice to Gabe
 Tonye Patano as Birdie, Rosemary's nanny
 Leigha and Juliette Nicoloro as Mae-Li, Rosemary's three year old adopted sister from Beijing China
 Josh Pais as Ronny, Leslie's new date
 Michael Bush as Max, a boy who's one of Gabe's friends
 John Dossett and Talia Balsam as Mickey and Jackie Telesco, Rosemary's parents
 Jonah Meyerson as Sam, a boy who is also one of Gabe's friends
 Brian W. Aguiar as Jacob, a boy who is also another of Gabe's friends 
 Connor Hutcherson (Josh Hutcherson's younger brother) as the boy who throws up
 Anthony Laflamme as Tim Staples, Rosemary's new karate partner and Gabe's rival
 Mike Chat as Himself, Gabe's karate hero.
 J. Kyle Manzay as Master Coles, The karate teacher from Gabe and Rosemary's karate class
 Nick Cubbler as Daryl Kitzens, the bully who is beat by Gabe and Rosemary
 Neil Jay Shastri as David Betanahu, Gabe's new karate partner

Production

The original idea for the film was just one sentence in a long list of ideas. Levin and Flackett wanted to make a project as directors, and an adolescent love story had the benefit of not being a project led by a star actor. They believed they could make it for a reasonable budget. From concept to completed script, it took about two months and the film was greenlit shortly after that.

Reception

Critical response
Little Manhattan received mostly positive reviews from film critics. On Rotten Tomatoes it has an approval rating of 77% based on reviews from 31 critics. The site's consensus states: "Little Manhattan is a sweet story of young love that provides an enlightening if pragmatic view on love and courtship." Metacritic gave it a score of 52 based on 10 reviews, indicating "mixed or average reviews".

BBC's Stella Papamichael wrote that the film was "sweet but not syrupy and heart-warming without being manipulative, this kid flick stands tall among recent Hollywood love stories". Kevin Thomas, writing for the Los Angeles Times, called the film "a handsome charmer about the avalanche of first love...an endearing, affectionately humorous and even lyrical depiction of the dawning of adolescence amid the privileged". Thomas called the script "problematic...[Gabe's] speech as soundtrack narrator of his own story is precociously improbable". Jeffrey Lyons of NBC called Little Manhattan "one of the sweetest, most touching films you'll see". Varietys Brian Lowry was less positive about the film. He wrote "Resting almost entirely on the shoulders of its young leads, both they and the pic lack the sparkle to sustain what seeks to be a whimsical premise but, except for a few moments, proves ponderous instead." He also believed the film belonged on "youth-targeting basic-cable networks" instead of having a cinematic release.

Box office
The film made $36,397 in the opening weekend in the United States. By December 18, 2005 the film had grossed $385,373. It had worldwide box office takings of $1,117,920.

Music
The film's score was composed by Chad Fischer, the guitarist and lead singer of Lazlo Bane.

The film also featured 18 other songs, half of which are covers, by a variety of musicians, from the well-known The Beatles and Elvis Presley to little-known The Meadows and Loston Harris. Chad Fischer contributed several songs to the film both as a performer and producer.

The soundtrack album for the film hasn't been released, making half of the songs used exclusive to the film.

Track listing

 A  Available on other releases
 B  Available to listen on Chad Fischer's Myspace page
 C  Available by original and/or other musicians

References

Notes

References

External links
 
 

2005 films
2005 romantic comedy films
20th Century Fox films
American children's films
American coming-of-age comedy films
American romantic comedy films
Films set in Manhattan
Films shot in New York City
American independent films
Regency Enterprises films
Films scored by Chad Fischer
2005 directorial debut films
Films about puberty
Films produced by Arnon Milchan
2000s English-language films
2000s American films